Kiss of Death, previously titled Breathless and Blood Rush, is a British crime investigation television film, written by Barbara Machin, author of the British television crime drama series Waking the Dead, that aired on BBC on 26 May 2008.

The one-off drama, intended as a backdoor pilot for a possible series, was originally written as a two-part series but was re-written several times at the request of BBC executives. The original running time of 120 minutes was also shortened to 90, and the programme was finally broadcast in one instalment in May 2008. The drama was produced by BBC Northern Ireland and shot in Bristol. A DVD was released in Sweden in 2010, but , has not been released in the UK. Viewing figures of 3.9 million did not prove strong enough for a full series to be commissioned.

Synopsis
A plot synopsis issued by the BBC in a press release read as follows: "In this drama, a killer has killed once and kidnapped another victim, challenging the investigative and forensic team to work out why. Suddenly everyone's past comes under scrutiny, everyone's version of the truth comes under suspicion. Kay Rousseau (Louise Lombard), who heads up the crime team, is back at work after the death of her child. Suspicion about her involvement in this death remains, not least in her own husband. Only Matt Costello (Danny Dyer), Kay's second-in-command and a dedicated, impassioned copper, is loyal to the core. Dr. George Austen (Lyndsey Marshal), the team's forensic scientist, worked on Kay's case and knows things Kay wished she didn't, and this isn't helped by her own fast increasing addiction to alcohol which puts her evidential work under unwelcome scrutiny.

Dr Clive Morrell (Shaun Parkes) is a profiler whose own mood swings and strange behaviour are causing concern within the team. Jude Whiley (Lenora Crichlow) is a rookie cop, who is young, fresh and has an energy and passion for the job that verges on obsession. Miles Trumeman (Ace Bhatti) plays Kay's husband Miles Trueman, who is a lawyer attached to the case. Brian McCardie plays killer Michael Bovery, a man obsessed with one of the team, and Jeffery Kissoon plays Commissioner Wilson, Rousseau's boss."

Cast
 Louise Lombard as Superintendent Kay Rousseau 
 Danny Dyer as Detective Inspector Matt Costello
 Lenora Crichlow as Detective Constable Jude Whiley
 Lyndsey Marshal as Dr. George Austen, pathologist
 Shaun Parkes as Dr. Clive Morrell, profiler
 Ace Bhatti as Miles Trueman, lawyer
 Caroline O'Hara as Jane, kidnap and rape victim  
 Neil McDermott as John, kidnap victim 
 Perry Benson as The Courier
 Brian McCardie as Michael Bovery 
 Jeffery Kissoon as Commissioner Wilson

Notes

External links
 

2008 British television series debuts
BBC television dramas
2008 British television series endings
British drama television series
English-language television shows